The following is the partial filmography of Sukumari, an Indian actress who began her career at the age of 10 with a minor role in the Tamil film Or Iravu in 1951. In a career spanning more than six decades, had acted in more than 2500 feature films in various Indian languages, including Malayalam, Tamil, Hindi, Telugu, Kannada, Sinhala, Oriya, English and Bengali.

She started her dance career in 1946. As a singer, she has also performed imany concerts. She is also known for her stage career in her early days and performed thousands of shows with various theatre groups. She was an active presence in movies, TV serials, albums, advertisements, dramas, television shows, stage shows, public programmes, special functions, and cultural events for more than 65 years.

Malayalam

1950s

1960s

1970s

1980s

1990s

2000s

2010s 
{| class="wikitable sortable"
|- style="background:#ccc; text-align:center;"
! Year !! Film !! Role !! Notes
|-
| rowspan=7 | 2010 || Kausthubham ||Yamuna's mother ||
|-
|| 3 Char Sau Bees ||Selvan's grandmother ||Dubbed into Tamil as Thiruttu Pasangal
|-
||  Four Friends ||Amir's grandmother ||Dubbed into Tamil as Anbulla Kamal and Telugu as Four Friends
|-
|| Thoovalkattu ||Sundaran's mother ||
|-
|| Best Actor ||Mother Superior ||
|-
|| Jayan, the Man behind the Legend  ||Herself||Documentary movie  Uncredited appearance (photos only)
|-
|| Yughapurushan || ||
|-
| rowspan=16 | 2011 ||Naayika ||Sukumari (herself)||
|-
|| Bangkok Summer ||Paatti ||
|-
|| Maharaja Talkies ||Vimala's aunt ||
|-
|| Ven Shankhu Pol ||Sulochana ||Also known as Ekadasi
|-
|| Khaddama||Razak's mother || Dubbed into Tamil  as Palaivana Roja, Hindi as Khaddama and  Telugu as Panjaram
|-
|| Ninnishtam Ennishtam 2 ||Kaakkathiyamma ||
|-
|| Priyappetta Nattukare || Vilasini||
|-
|| Kathayile Nayika ||Annamma ||
|-
|| Swapnamalika ||Appu's grandmother ||
|-
|| Kattu Paranja Katha ||Rajammal ||
|-
|| Pakida Pakida Pandhrande || ||
|-
|| Oru Marubhoomikkadha || ||
|-
|| Naale|| ||
|-
|| Adhithyan|| ||
|-
|| The Train ||   ||
|-
|| Manushyamrugham || ||
|-
| rowspan=15 | 2012 || Ayalum Njanum Thammil||Sister Lucy||Kerala State Film Award for Best Popular Film
|-
|| Karmayodha||Mad Maddy's mother ||Dubbed into Tamil as Vetrimaaran IPS
|-
|| Doctor Innocent aanu ||Noorjahan ||
|-
|| Chattakaari||Margerette ||
|-
|| Ardhanaari ||Priest (Thayamma)||Also known as Ivan Ardhanaari
|-
|| Karppooradeepam ||Bhavani||
|-
|| Lakshmi Vilasam Renuka Makan Raghuram ||Renuka's grandmother||
|-
|| Trivandrum Lodge||Peggy||
|-
|| Diamond Necklace||Rajasree's grandmother||Dubbed into Tamil as Diamond Necklace
|-
|| Graamam ||Ammini Amma ||Kerala State Film Award for Best StoryNational Film Award for Best Costume Design
|-
|| Lumiere Brothers||Herself ||Archive footage from Chakkikotha Chankaran
|-
|| Yaadharthyam||- ||
|-
|| Vilappilshala|| ||
|-
|| Aayiram Kannumayi|| ||
|-
|| Masters|| ||
|-
| rowspan=20 |2013|| Oronanalil ||- ||Short film
|-
|| Ayaal ||Thevichi (Old village lady) ||Posthumously releasedKerala State Film Award for Best CinematographyAlso known as Nagabandham
|-
|| August Club || Bhagavati Amma ||Posthumously releasedAlso known as August Club Since 1969Earlier titled as Venalinte Kalaneekkanga'''
|-
|| Mumbai Police ||Cameo||Posthumously released
|-
|| Hotel California ||Rafeeq's mother ||Posthumously released
|-
|| Immanuel || Khadeejumma ||Posthumously released
|-
|| Progress Report || Bhagyalakshmi Ammal||Posthumously releasedDubbed into Tamil as Thalaiyazuthu Meiyazuthu|-
|| SIM ||Seetharama Iyer's Paatti ||Posthumously released
|-
|| Cleopatra ||Ramdas's mother ||Posthumously released
|-
|| 3G Third Generation ||Devoottiamma ||Posthumously released
|- 
|| Black Butterfly ||Old orphan lady ||
|-
|| Proprietors: Kammath & Kammath || Surekha's grandmother ||Dubbed into Hindi as Proprietors: Kammath & Kammath|-
|| Breaking News Live ||Madhavi ||
|-
|| David & Goliath||Kurisamma ||
|-
|| Rebecca Uthup Kizhakkemala || Annamma ||
|-
 ||Oru Yathrayil ||Sathyamma ||Segment: "Amma"
|-
|| Good Idea||-||
|-
|| Njaan Anaswaran || ||
|-
|| Romans || ||
|-
|| Nadodimannan || ||
|-
| rowspan=4 |2014|| Mannar Mathai Speaking 2||Balakrishnan's mother|| Cameo in the title song Shot from Mannar Mathai SpeakingArchive footage
|-
|| Kadalkaattiloru Dooth/Ode of Ocean ||Herself||Documentary movie  Uncredited appearance (photos only)
|-
|| Tharangal ||Herself||Photo archive  Posthumously released
|-
|| Marching Ahead ||The Element of Life || Documentary film
|-
| rowspan=3 |2015 || Kukkiliyar ||Sudhi's mother || Posthumously released
|-
|| Mathru Vandhanam ||Saraswathi Ammal ||Posthumously releasedAlso known as Rajuvum Ammayum|-
|| Mayapuri 3D ||Adithyan's grandmother ||Posthumously releasedDubbed into Hindi as Mayapuri 3D|-
| 2018 || Mohanalal ||Herself || Archive footage from Dasharatham Posthumously released
|-
| rowspan=2 |2019 || Aakasha Ganga 2 ||Maanikkasheri Thampuratti || Photo archive from Aakasha Ganga Posthumously released
|-
|| Thanka Bhasma Kuriyitta Thamburatti ||Herself || Photo archive  Posthumously released
|-
|}

 Tamil 

 Telugu 

 Kannada 

 Hindi 

 English 

 French 

 Bengali 

 Sinhala 

Voice Artist/Extra Dubbing Credits

Television serials (Partial list)

Stage plays (selection)

Albums/Videos

Television - Non-fiction

As presenter
 Radio show - AIR

As award jury
 JC Daniel Award 2012TV/Online programmes

 Interview/Kairali Archive (Kairali TV) 
 Symphony (Surya TV)
 Manorama News Programme Strikers & Crew Peggy eggs.com Webindia123.com - 2009
 Indiavision.com Indianterminal.com Kerala9.com Siffy.com Hot & Sour Stardust Mango Media MixedStage shows

 Aamchi Mumbai Alukkas Fairy Tale Alukkas Millennium Nite 
 AMMA Stage show 2004 Asianet Film Awards Asiavision TV Awards Cinestar Night, Australia Classical Dance Program at United Nations ECAFE Conference in Bangalore Dalimond Show Defense Programme Drishya Television Award Nite Face Dubai Mega Show Goodwin  Jewellers Mega Event Grihalakshmi TV Awards Kairali Cultural Association Onam  Fest Lux Asianet 
 Madhavasandhya Malayalam Television Association Award Night Mathrubhumi Film Awards Minnale TV Awards Mohanlal Show 92 MTVA TV Award Night 2000  Onagosham 2012 Onam Fest 2003, Kairal Cultural Association Priyapetta Mohanlal Siddique Lal's Cinegalaxy 94 Thalamurakalude Sangamam Sreekuttan 
 Starry Nite 2003, Bangalore State Level Arts Festival Suryathejassode Amma Television and Audio Awards The Mammootty Stage Festival 96 Vanitha Film AwardsCultural shows/Special programmes

 100th Woman's Day Celebrations (KSWDC)
 Aazhchamela Aakshavani Radio Programmes AMMA Programmes Anachamayam Ancad Sankaranarayamoorthy Temple Programme ATMA Programmes Attukal Pongala Balagokulam's Janmashtami celebrations Chalakkudi Nagarasabha Christmas Virunnu Children's Film Fest Cho's Nadaka Mela Cinespot Programme Darppanam Malayalam Short Film Pooja Devan's Felicitation Function Eastman Studio Function FICCI Programme Friendship Club Onagosham Gamer (2014 Malayalam Movie)
 Garudanageyam Golden Jubilee Celebration of Kandam Becha Kottu Go Green, Save Nature Green Piece Grihalakshmi Interview Gurupooja Guruvayoor Satyagraha Remembrance 
 Honour to Sivaji Ganesan by AMMA IFFK (16th)
 Indian Magic Academy - Fantasia Award Function Information and Guidance Society, Thiruvathira Celebrations Inauguration International Peace Film Festival Ividam Swargamannu Movie Press Conference Kadakkal Programme Kala Abudhabi Kalashreshta Award Function Kasargod Mahotsavam Keli Inauguration Kudumbashree Marketing Division Inauguration Lionthalon-2013 Maarunna Malayali Mahamanjalprayude Bhadradeepa Prakashanam Makara Pongala Malayalapuzha Inauguration Mannali Pongala Inauguration 
 Mathrubhumi Newspaper Programme Mathrubhumi SEED Programme Memory Lane Over Lunch Mohandas College of Engineering & Technology College Day Celebrations Mohanlal Fans Association First Year Celebrations Mullapperiyar Dam Discussion Muthassiyarkavu Pongala Nandalala Seva Samithi Trust Souvenir release Nayaru Pidicha Pulivalu Golden Jubilee NIMS Hospital (Heart to Heart Scheme) Onakodiyum Oonhalum "Padmarajan" Book Release Programme Pazhayakavu Kshethra Utsavam Platinum Jubilee of Malayalam cinema Pune Malayali Sangamam Radio Interviews Rajagiri PTA Day Roses The Family Club Anniversary Sakhi TV Office Programme Samanwayam Saraswathi Vidyalayam School Day Annual Event Shivagiri Theerthadana Mahamaham Sneha Trust Heart of Love Special Cookery Programme Srichithira Thirunnal Birthday Anniversary Sri Chithra Home Onam Celebrations Sri Eruthikkavu Pongala Mahotsavam The Hindu  Newspaper Programme True Indian Function Veteran's Meet Ulnadu Temple Programme Wayanad Mahotsavam Webdunia Programme Weekly Round Up (interview)
 Women's Day Inauguration (Big Bazar, TVM)
 World Diabetes Day Celebrations Inauguration (Little Flower Hospital and Research Centre)

Dubbed Releases

 BhojpuriKhilladi Ka ChallengePonnar Shankar Hindi Aaj Ka Kurukshetra			Aakhri Sangram			Aarayan Mera Naam Aayi Phirse BahariAbhimanyuAladdin and the Wonderful Lamp			Amar Shaheed			Basha: The BossBaap Bete Ben JohnsonChakravartyVikramaditya			Chandramukhi Devdas			Commando			Daisy			Dangerous Khiladi 3Deivam			Desh Ka Gaddar 			Dharma Yodha			DharmadhikariDiamond NecklaceDumdaar Commissioner	Erra Samrajyam 		Friendship			Girafthari		Highway Hum Nahi Jhukenge				Jaan Pe Khelkar			Jaanbaaz Policewala			Jaanwar Aur Insan	Khaddama		Khooni Insaan			Lava Kusa			Maaya Ka Saaya			Man Ka AanganManzil Pyaar KiMayapuri 3DMera Bheta	Mizhikal Sakshi		Mr. Badmash			Neel Kamal	Pathram		Peoples Dada			Phir Aaya Deewana	Proprietors: Kammath & Kammath		Prashanth Veer	Ramayan		Rough Tough			Rowdy Cheetah			Samba			Satyaghath - Crime Never PaysTiger Shiva			Zahreele SaanpKannada
 Lava KusaYen Hudgiro Yaking HadthiroShakshi Malayalam Alai PayutheyChila Nerangalil Chila ManushyarMounam SamadhamPammal K SambandamPremabhishekhamRandum Randum AnchuSuryaputhrikal Vasantha Malika Yaradi Nee Mohini Marathi 
 Mazaa MulgaOdia
 Ben Johnson Tamil Aranmanai Kadhali Anbulla Kamal		
 Arasan		
 Asoakan	
 Avala Aaviya Ben Johnson Bhagawan	
 Commissioner Eeswar Pandiyan DakshayagnamKuttram Thandanai	Love BirdsMadhuchandralekha Malleswaran Mangaikku Maangalyame Pradhaanam  Maravathoor Kanavu		
 Monalisa	
 Mr. Deva	
 Murari Nammvar Nata Nigazh Kaalam				
 Paasa Mozhi		
 Palaivana Roja Paraimedu 
 Patti Vikramathithan	
 Periya  Gounder Progress Report		
 Pudhiya Visarana		
 Puliyattam Raam Bhaktha Hanuman		
 Raghavan		
 Samba		
 Sambhavam Seetha Kalyanam	
 Thalayana Manthram Thalaiyazuthu Meiyazuthu Thalaipu Seithigal Thiruttu Pasangal	
 Ulagesh 	
 Vaira Malai Valthu Giren 
 Vazhthukirean	
 Vetrimaaran IPS		
 Viratham		
 Vizhigal Satchi Telugu 
 Aadharsha Saadharalu Abhiram Addala Meda Alavuthinum Arputha Deepam			
 Ajatha Satruvu			
 Ankuram Andhala Raja Anthuleni Prayanam Bhagyachakram Bhayankara Ratri Brahmachari CBI Officer			
 Challenger			
 Commissioner Rudrama Naidu			
 Delhi Diary			
 Devi Bhagavathi			
 Doravari Satram			
 English Ammayi	
 Erra Rajyam		
 Evidaine Sare Four Friends			
 Guru Dakshana I Love You Teacher Intini Didina Illalu Journalist Kamakshi			
 Lawyer The Great			
 Love To Love Madhuchandralekha Manushulu Marali 			
 Monica	
 Nayakudu		
 New Delhi			
 Nuvve Naa Srimathi			
 Paatagadu	
 Police Hecharika		
 Pandava Samrajyam			
 Panjaram			
 Papa Kosam			
 Peda Raja	
 Prathignya Premaku Padhabhishekam Premalo Anjali Geetha Krishna Puli Veta			
 Rajakota Rahasyam			
 Rakshakudu Rangoon Raja  
 Sahasaveerudu			
 Sakhi			
 Sampoorna Ramayanam			
 Sundarangudu Swami Ayyappa			
 Taxi Driver			
 Tiger Rajani Veedagni			
 Veerapandiya Kattabrahmanna			
 YoddhaRelated shows

 Smrithi (Safari TV)
 Padamudrakal (ACV)
 Democrazy (Reporter TV)
 Thalolam (Amrita TV)
 Idivettu Thamasha (Surya Comedy)
 Cinema Kottaka (Kaumudy TV)
 Indraya Naalil (Capital TV)
 Puthiya Geethangal (Asianet)
 Filmy Fridays'' (YouTube)

References

Actress filmographies
Indian filmographies